David Hardt is an American politician from the state of Texas. He is the former President of the Young Democrats of America (2007–2009), a former member of the Democratic National Committee and Executive Committee of the DNC. He was elected as the President of the Dallas County Young Democrats in 2005, which during his tenure grew to become the second largest chapter of Young Democrats in the Nation.

Hardt also served as the National Committeeman from the State of Texas to YDA from 2004 to 2007. He was elected as President of the Young Democrats of America in July 2007 at the YDA National Convention in Dallas, Texas. He won with the highest percentage of a contested election in YDA history, capturing almost 93% of the vote, and was the first openly gay president. Hardt served as an elected Delegate to the 2004 Democratic National Convention and served as a Super Delegate to the 2008 Democratic National Convention.

References 

Living people
Texas Democrats
American LGBT politicians
Year of birth missing (living people)
21st-century LGBT people